Andy Collins (born 1971, Atlanta, US) is an artist based in New York.

Collins studied at Atlanta College of Art in 1994, and completed his MFA at School of Visual Arts, New York, in 1999.

Collins has exhibited in a number of shows including “The Galleries Show” at the Royal Academy  in London and “Extreme Abstraction” at Albright-Knox Art Gallery, Buffalo.  He has shown internationally at galleries such as Krinzinger Projekte in Vienna and Ghislaine Hussenot, Paris.

External links
Andy Collins – Painting – Saatchi Gallery
 

1971 births
Living people
Artists from New York (state)
School of Visual Arts alumni